Gary Flood (born September 7, 1985 in Hauppauge, New York) is an American soccer player who formerly plays for Long Island Rough Riders in the USL Premier Development League.

Career

College
Flood attended Hauppauge High School and played four years of college soccer at Hofstra University. He was drafted by the Revolution in the 2nd round of the 2007 MLS Supplemental Draft and was signed to a developmental contract.

Professional
Flood saw limited time in his rookie season, making five appearances, usually as a defensive midfielder.  Even though only making five appearances, he made two starts, one of them being the season opener. Due to being a defensive midfielder below Shalrie Joseph and Jeff Larentowicz on the depth chart, Flood saw as little playing time in 2008 as he did his rookie season, and the club did not renew his developmental contract after the 2008 season.

Having not found a professional club to play for in 2009, Flood signed with Long Island Rough Riders of the USL Premier Development League for the 2009 season.

Honors

New England Revolution
Lamar Hunt U.S. Open Cup (1): 2007

References

External links
 MLS player profile

1985 births
Living people
People from Hauppauge, New York
American soccer players
Hofstra Pride men's soccer players
Long Island Rough Riders players
New England Revolution players
Major League Soccer players
USL League Two players
New England Revolution draft picks
Soccer players from New York (state)
American Indoor Soccer League players
Association football midfielders